Perryville School District 7 is a public school district based in Perryville, Arkansas.

The school district supports more than 1,000 students and employs more than 150 faculty and staff. The district encompasses  of land, in Perry County and Conway County.

Within Perry County it includes Perryville, Adona, and Aplin. Some students from Paron, within the Bryant School District in Saline County, instead attend Perryville schools.

Schools 
 Perryville High School, serving grades 7 through 12.
 Perryville Elementary School, serving kindergarten through grade 6.

References

External links
 

Education in Conway County, Arkansas
Education in Perry County, Arkansas
School districts in Arkansas